The Rift Tour was a virtual concert event by Ariana Grande, held on the video game Fortnite Battle Royale. The show was played five times between August 6 and 8, 2021. Grande described the tour as "…an unforgettable, magical journey to new realities.” During the tour, players were able to purchase a skin of Grande and other cosmetic features inspired by the event to play as her in-game. Other artists, including Travis Scott and Marshmello previously held concerts in Fortnite as well, but Grande's was the first to tie in to multiple aspects of the game.

Setlist 
Three minigames took place before the concert began. Each one had a song playing with it.

 Come & Go by Juice Wrld & Marshmello
 Audio by LSD
 Victorious by Wolfmother

The concert itself consisted of the following songs.

 Raindrops (An Angel Cried)
 7 Rings
 Be Alright
 R.E.M.
 The Way
 Positions

Event times 
In order for people around the world to see the event at a reasonable hour, there were 5 shows over the course of the weekend, each marketed for a different region of the world.

References 

Virtual events
Fortnite
Ariana Grande
Ariana Grande concert tours